Eressa vespoides is a moth of the family Erebidae. It was described by Walter Rothschild in 1910. It is found in Assam, India.

References

Eressa
Moths described in 1910